The pound was the currency of Tonga until 1967. It was subdivided into 20 shillings, each of 12 pence.

History

Initially, sterling coins and notes circulated. This was supplemented, from 1921, by banknotes issued by the Tongan government. The notes were denominated in sterling and included the rather unusual denomination of 4 shillings. When the Australian pound devalued relative to sterling at the beginning of the Great depression, this caused considerable confusion on the smaller islands of the British Western Pacific. In the mid-1930s people in these islands were asking whether or not their sterling accounts were to be considered as the pound sterling, or the Australian pound. Clarification was sought. In 1936, the Tongan pound was devalued to 16/– stg, or £1/5/– = £1 stg, thus setting the Tongan pound equal to the Australian pound. Existing banknotes had the word "sterling" overstamped, later issues omitted the word altogether. In 1967, the pound was replaced by the pa'anga at a rate of £1 = T$2.

For a more general view of history in the wider region, see British currency in Oceania.

Banknotes

In 1921, £5 notes were introduced, followed by notes for 4/– and 10/– and £1 in 1933. These four denominations were issued until 1966.

See also

 Economy of Tonga

References

External links
 

Currencies of the British Empire
Currencies of the Commonwealth of Nations
Currencies of Oceania
Modern obsolete currencies
Pound
1967 disestablishments
History of Tonga